The 2019 Rhode Island Rams football team represented the University of Rhode Island in the 2019 NCAA Division I FCS football season. They were led by sixth-year head coach Jim Fleming and played their home games at Meade Stadium. They were a member of the Colonial Athletic Association. They finished the season 2–10, 0–8 in CAA play to finish in last place.

Previous season

The Rams finished the 2018 season 6–5, 4–4 in CAA play to finish in seventh place.

Preseason

CAA poll
In the CAA preseason poll released on July 23, 2019, the Rams were predicted to finish in eighth place.

Preseason All–CAA team
The Rams had two players selected to the preseason all-CAA team.

Offense

Aaron Parker – WR

Kyle Murphy – OL

Schedule

Source:

Game summaries

at Ohio

Delaware

at New Hampshire

Stony Brook

at Brown

at Virginia Tech

at Albany

Elon

Merrimack

at William & Mary

at Maine

James Madison

Players drafted into the NFL

References

Rhode Island
Rhode Island Rams football seasons
Rhode Island Rams football